Strip Me is the third studio album by the English singer and songwriter Natasha Bedingfield. It was released on 7 December 2010 by Phonogenic Records. "Touch" was released as the first single from the album on 18 May 2010 and "Strip Me" was released as the second single on 31 August 2010. Neither of the singles was successful on the US Billboard charts. The album's title song peaked at number twenty-three on the adult contemporary chart. The album debuted at number 103 on US Billboard 200 with 10,000 copies sold, a significant drop from her previous album, N.B., which debuted at number three selling 50,000 units.

In Europe, Strip Me was released in May 2011 under the title Strip Me Away, with more colorful artwork and an expanded list of tracks. It charted only in Germany and Switzerland.

Background and production 
Bedingfield finished recording the album in July 2010. The project's title was unveiled on Bedingfield's official Twitter page on 15 July 2010. She described the album as "be[ing] the next level from what I've already done....It's just more vibrant and exciting. And I can't wait for people to hear it." In an interview with Billboard, Bedingfield said, 

The thirteen-track standard edition, the twenty-one track deluxe edition and pre-order bonus track editions of the album were compiled from more than 50 songs which Bedingfield had written since touring. In an interview with PopEater she said, "I've been touring for so many years now that I wrote with my live gigs in mind. I wanted to write anthems that people could sing along to – things that were still personal, but definitely trying to find the best way to connect with people." On the album, she worked with Andreas Kleerup, John Hill, Wyclef Jean, Salaam Remi, Ryan Tedder, Jonas Myrin, Eg White, and Sia. None of the songs worked on with Jean, Remi or Furler made the final track listing, although all of the songs on the final track list were co-written by Bedingfield. Additionally, Idolator revealed that Bedingfield had recorded a Ne-Yo-assisted duet titled "The Little Things", which was produced by StarGate, though it was not included on the final album either. Bedingfield told fans in December 2010, via a recorded video message, that the album could be released elsewhere in the world later but for the near present she was focusing on America.

Promotion 
Bedingfield's label, Epic Records, outlined plans for her to tour in the second half of 2010, in support of the album. However, in September 2010, Billboard revealed that Bedingfield's tour plans were moved back into 2011 though no dates were confirmed. Additionally, the singer announced that "Touch" would be used in TV commercials for Nivea skin care. The album track "Can't Fall Down" was exclusively streamed via Billboards official website on 3 December 2010. Another song from the album, "Weightless", was made available to stream on the E! Online website. Bedingfield promoted the album with performances of the title song on The Today Show on 7 December, Live with Regis and Kelly on 8 December, The Tonight Show with Jay Leno on 9 December 2010 as well as appearances on Chelsea Lately and Rachel Ray. She was also announced on the line-up for Dick Clark's New Year's Rockin' Eve concert hosted by Ryan Seacrest. According to AOL online, Bedingfield also signed a promotion deal with Hotel Indigo which would see cross promotion of the hotel chain and album. In January 2011, Bedingfield was invited to the head offices of Rolling Stone magazine, where she performed "Pocketful of Sunshine", "Soulmate" and "Strip Me". To promote the album, Bedingfield announced her Less is More Tour, which began on 5 June and included 29 US cities. The deluxe version of Strip Me subsequently included several audio and video recordings from the Less is More Tour dates.

"Strip Me" and "A Little Too Much" became official theme songs for the films Morning Glory and Something Borrowed respectively, being used in both the trailers and in the films' ending credits. "Neon Lights" was used in the end credits of the 2011 film What's Your Number?. "Recover" was later used to help promote State Farm in their State of Despair  TV spot.

Singles 
"Touch" was the album's lead single. The up-tempo song was written by Bedingfield, Julien Bunetta and Steve Kipner, and produced by Bunetta and Kipner, It was released to the iTunes Store on 18 May 2010. It was sent to US mainstream radio stations on 29 June 2010. The song peaked on the Canadian Hot 100 at number sixty. However, it was later declared a buzz single by Bedingfield's official website and the album's "Strip Me" was revealed as the replacement lead single. "Strip Me" was released to mainstream radio stations on 31 August 2010 and digital download on 21 September 2010. "Strip Me" was moderately more successful, reaching number sixty-five in Canada and number ninety-one on the Billboard Hot 100.

Critical reception 

At Metacritic, which assigns a normalised rating out of 100 to reviews from mainstream critics, the album received a weighted average score of 60, based on 4 reviews, which indicates "mixed or average reviews". Mikael Wood of Entertainment Weekly gave Strip Me a C rating and wrote that it "plays like one long, increasingly desperate pep talk. The only breather? 'Unexpected Hero,' a lovely late-Beatles-style ballad." The AllMusic editor, Stephen Thomas Erlewine, noted the album for "retaining [the] same blend of well-manicured R&B and European sophistication" of Bedingfield's first album and commented that she "plays it exceptionally safe, to the extent that she even tones down the self-empowerment of her first two records, preferring pristine blue-eyed soul and adult contemporary ballads, all tailored for an aspirational upscale lifestyle". Slant Magazines Jonathon Keefe found it "single-minded in its uplifting, inspirational tone", writing in conclusion that "Bedingfield uses her powerful voice to oversing most of her material, making Strip Me feel like even more of a sermon. It may not be the year's worst pop album, but it might just be the most exhausting and heavy-handed."

Commercial performance 
Strip Me was originally due to be released on 9 November 2010; however, it was pushed back to 7 December 2010. It was Bedingfield's third album to be released in the United States and Canada and the second release by Bedingfield to be released exclusively in those territories, following Pocketful of Sunshine in 2008. On 16 December 2010, the album made its US Billboard 200 chart debut at number 103, having sold just under 10,000 copies. It was a significant decline compared to Pocketful of Sunshine (2008), which debuted at number three having sold 50,000 copies. It remained in the top 200 for just its opening week; but re-appeared in 2011, on 15 January, at number 167, and climbed to number 157 the following week.

Track listing

Strip Me

Strip Me Away
Outside of North America, Strip Me was released under the title Strip Me Away, with an amended track listing.

Sample credits
 "All I Need" contains samples and excerpts from "Let It Rock" by Kevin Rudolf.

Personnel 
Taken from Barnes & Noble.

Performance credits

Natasha Bedingfield – lead vocals
Steve Kipner – percussion
Vinnie Colaiuta – drums
Nick Lashley – guitar
John Shanks – bass guitar, guitar, keyboards
David Glass – guitar, percussion, ukulele
Marshall Altman – percussion
Curt Schneider – bass guitar
Wayne Wilkins – keyboards
Michael Chaves – acoustic guitar, electric guitar
Zac Rae – banjo, piano, keyboards, xylophone, Wurlitzer

Andrew Frampton – bass guitar, guitar
David Levita – acoustic guitar, electric guitar
Ryan Tedder – guitar, keyboards
Aaron Sterling – percussion, drums
Jonas Myrin – keyboards
Kleerup – guitar, keyboards, sounds
John Hill – guitar
Jess Collins – background vocals
Charlie Judge – keyboards
Eric Robinson – electric guitar

Technical credits

Steve Kipner – producer
Lars Fox – Pro-Tools
John Shanks – producer
David Glass – engineer, vocal engineer
Marshall Altman – arranger, programming, producer
Wayne Wilkins – programming, producer, engineer
Noel Zancanella – engineer
Andrew Frampton – producer
Jeff Rothschild – programming, engineer, drum programming
Björn Yttling – string arrangements

Ryan Tedder – programming, producer
Natasha Bedingfield – producer, executive producer, vocal producer
Julian Bunetta –  producer, instrumentation
Kleerup – producer, beats
John Hill – programming, producer, instrumentation
Brian "Big Bass" Gardner – mastering
Eric Robinson – engineer
Henrik Gustafsson – engineer
Calle Bagge – string arrangements

Charts

Release history

References

Natasha Bedingfield albums
Epic Records albums
2010 albums
Albums recorded at Henson Recording Studios